Zheleznogorsk  is the name of several populated places in Russia, and may refer to:
 Zheleznogorsk, Krasnoyarsk Krai, a closed town in Siberia that was once a secret town
 Zheleznogorsk, Kursk Oblast, a town located northwest of Kursk that serves as the administrative center of Zheleznogorsky District
 Zheleznogorsk-Ilimsky, a town and administrative center of Nizhneilimsky District in Irkutsk Oblast
 Zheleznogorsky District, an administrative and municipal district in Kursk Oblast
 Zheleznogorsk Airport, located just south of Zheleznogorsk-Ilimsky

See also 
 Zheleznogorsk Urban Okrug
 Zheleznogorsky (disambiguation)